Shangxinzhuang (Mandarin: 上新庄镇) is a town in Huangzhong District, Xining, Qinghai, China. In 2010, Shangxinzhuang had a total population of 32,437: 16,859 males and 15,578 females: 7,523 aged under 14, 23,190 aged between 15 and 65 and 1,724 aged over 65.

References 
 

Township-level divisions of Qinghai
Xining
Towns in China